Judith Fabiola Vázquez Saut (born 30 December 1977) is a Mexican politician from the Institutional Revolutionary Party. From 2009 to 2010 she served as Deputy of the LXI Legislature of the Mexican Congress representing Veracruz.

References

1977 births
Living people
Politicians from Veracruz
Women members of the Chamber of Deputies (Mexico)
Institutional Revolutionary Party politicians
21st-century Mexican politicians
21st-century Mexican women politicians
Deputies of the LXI Legislature of Mexico
Members of the Chamber of Deputies (Mexico) for Veracruz